was a district located in Niigata Prefecture, Japan.

As of 2003, the district had an estimated population of 20,066 and a density of 79.29 persons per km2. The total area was 253.07 km2.

Towns and villages
Prior to its dissolution, the district consisted of only one town:

 Muramatsu

History

In 1878, Nakakanbara District was established.

The district started to shrink after the town of Nuttari merged with Niigata and the city continued to absorb the district. Three towns later gained city status during a 10-year period: Niitsu in 1951, Gosen in 1954 and Shirone (part of Niigata) in 1959.

 On June 1, 1959 - The town of Shirone was elevated to city status to become the city of Shirone. (3 towns, 1 village)
 On November 1, 1996 - The village of Yokogoshi was elevated to town status to become the town of Yokogoshi. (4 towns)

Recent mergers
 On March 21, 2005 - The towns of Kameda, Kosudo and Yokogoshi, along with the cities of Niitsu, Shirone and Toyosaka, the town of Nishikawa, and the villages of Ajikata, Iwamuro, Katahigashi, Nakanokuchi and Tsukigata (all from Nishikanbara District), were merged into the expanded city of Niigata.
 On January 1, 2006 - The town of Muramatsu was merged into the expanded city of Gosen. Nakakanbara District was dissolved as a result of this merger.

See also
 List of dissolved districts of Japan

Nakakanbara District
1878 establishments in Japan
2006 disestablishments in Japan